Paula Michelle Devicq is a Canadian actress, known for her role as Kirsten Bennett on the Golden Globe-winning television drama Party of Five, a role she played between 1994 and 2000.

Life and career
Devicq was born in Edmonton, Alberta.

She began her modeling career at the age of 18. She primarily worked in New York and Paris, where she was represented by modeling agencies Ford and Elite, and would go on to appear on magazine covers and in major advertising campaigns for companies such as Estée Lauder.

She played ADA Cynthia Bennington in the short-lived but critically acclaimed A&E network series 100 Centre Street starring Alan Arkin and directed by Sidney Lumet. She then followed up with a recurring role on Rescue Me and earlier in her career starred in the TV movie Wounded Heart, an emotional drama set in Texas. As a native of Edmonton and Vancouver, she practiced figure skating two hours before and after school each day. She appeared in the feature films Forbidden Love, with Andrew McCarthy and Richard Chamberlain, and Arbitrage, opposite Richard Gere and Susan Sarandon. She also played a role in Party of Five as Kirsten Bennett for six seasons.

Filmography

References

External links

Actresses from Edmonton
Canadian film actresses
Canadian television actresses
Living people
1965 births